CPD may refer to:

Science and technology
 CPD (gene), a human gene encoding the protein Carboxypeptidase D
 Chronic pulmonary disease, a pathological condition
 Cephalopelvic disproportion, when the capacity of the pelvis is inadequate to allow the fetus to negotiate the birth canal
 Cyclobutane pyrimidine dimer, a common UV product
 Cyclopentadiene, an organic compound
 Canonical polyadic decomposition, in mathematics
 Copy/Paste Detector, software to find duplicate computer code
 Chemical compound, a substance formed by chemical union
 Cyproterone acetate, a progestin and antiandrogen
 Conditional probability distribution, a kind of distribution in statistics

Organizations
 Centre for Policy Development, an Australian think tank
 Centre for Policy Dialogue, Bangladesh
 Centres of Plant Diversity, a classification initiative
 Commission on Presidential Debates, a US nonprofit
 Committee on the Present Danger, an American foreign policy interest group

Police
 Cambridge Police Department (Massachusetts)
Camden Police Department (New Jersey), a defunct police department dissolved in 2012
 Carmel Police Department (Indiana)
 Charleston Police Department (West Virginia)
 Chattanooga Police Department, Tennessee
 Chicago Police Department, Illinois
 Cincinnati Police Department, Ohio
 Cleveland Police Department, Ohio
 Columbus Police Department, Ohio
 Town of Carmel Police Department (New York)

Other uses
 Carnet de Passages en Douane, a customs document
 Collaborative product development, in business
 The Constitutional Practice and Discipline of the Methodist Church of Great Britain
 Construction Products Directive, a repealed EU Directive
 Continuing professional development
 Danio margaritatus (also known as the Celestial Pearl Danio), a fish native to Southeast Asia
 Coober Pedy Airport, IATA airport code "CPD"

See also
 Congress of People's Deputies (disambiguation)